The Boston Consolidated TRACON (A90) is located in Merrimack, New Hampshire. A90 opened in 2004 after 8 years of development. The A90 function transferred to the new Boston Consolidated TRACON on February 22, 2004. The MHT function transferred over on March 7, 2004. Manchester TRACON used to be located at Manchester Airport below the old ATCT. Boston TRACON used to be located at the Logan International Airport Control Tower before being consolidated. A Terminal Radar Approach Control, or TRACON, is responsible for descending airplanes from the ARTCC and lining them up for landing at their destination airport, as well as climbing departures before handing off to the ARTCC.

The primary responsibility of the Boston TRACON is the safe, orderly, and expeditious flow of arrival, departure, and en-route traffic. A90 is responsible for one main airport, Boston Logan International Airport. Additionally, A90 is responsible for dozens of smaller but busy fields, including Manchester-Boston Regional Airport, Hanscom Field, Norwood Memorial Airport, Beverly Municipal Airport, Lawrence Municipal Airport, Portsmouth International Airport at Pease, and Nashua Airport.

The Boston TRACON is one of six "Medium TRACONs"  currently existing throughout the United States. The others include the Salt Lake TRACON, the Bradley TRACON, the Indianapolis TRACON, the Pensacola TRACON, and the Des Moines TRACON.

According to the FAA Air Traffic Activity Data System below are the traffic counts for A90:
2005 729,625 ops
2006 710,765 ops
2007 693,158 ops
2008 639,782 ops
2009 603,131 ops
2010 634,151 ops
2011 626,137 ops
2012 595,823 ops
2013 603,974 ops
2014 604,516 ops
 2015 615,078 ops
 2016 639,759 ops
2017 658,524 ops
2018 805,780 ops
2019 824,230 ops

A90 is part of the FAA New England District. The Boston Consolidated TRACON is considered the HUB facility for the following facilities:
Bangor ATCT/TRACON
Manchester ATCT
Boston ATCT
Providence ATCT/TRACON
Cape TRACON - Which was consolidated to A90 in February 2018 as part of the FAA's efforts to reduce its infrastructure footprint. 
Bedford ATCT
Nantucket ATCT
Portland ATCT/TRACON
Burlington ATCT/TRACON

Areas of Specialization 
With the ongoing consolidation of Cape TRACON into the building in 2018, a new division of airspace has emerged. The new configuration will be a "Boston-North" and "Boston-South" areas of specialization. 

Two sectors shared between both areas are Initial Departure ID and Lincoln SL.

Boston North Area - Airspace to the north of Boston Logan International Airport. These airports include  BOS, BED, LWM, BVY, MHT, ASH, PSM, CON

Boston South  Area -  Airspace to the south of Boston Logan International Airport. These airports include OWD, PYM, FMH, HYA, MVY, ACK, CQX, PVC

A90 is bordered by the following facilities:

Providence TRACON (G90)
Bradley TRACON (Y90)
Portland TRACON (PWM)
Boston Air Route Traffic Control Center

Boston - North Area 

 Low - SO - 125.8250 MHz; 353.500 MHz

The Low sector overlies the Pease Airport from above the surface to and including 4,000 feet (1,200 m). This sector owns from about 25 miles (40 km) north of Pease to about 25 miles (40 km) south of Pease, and from 15 miles (24 km) east to 15 miles (24 km) west of Pease. This sector is primarily responsible for arrivals and departures at Pease Airport. Low is always combined at East, and is only opened for training purposes.

 East Coordinator: 

This coordinator is responsible for assisting the East (SE) Sector. Like the other position this controller performs inter and intra-facility coordination. This position has the capability to monitor any position/frequency

 East - SE - 125.050 MHz; 269.400 MHz

The East sector overlies the Low sector from above 4000 to and including 10,000. This sector sequences and descends BOS Area arrivals via ENE and hands off to the Rockport sector. This sector also climbs and descends arrivals and departures at Manchester, Pease, and satellites.

 Manchester Flight Data

One of the responsibilities of this position is that the controller makes flight plan entries and amendments via the FDIO and the STARS equipment. The controller reviews and flight plans for accuracy and forwards the strips to the appropriate sectors. They also issue departure clearances to aircraft. Another duty of this controller is to forward PIREP (Pilot Reports) to the appropriate facilities such as the flight service station.

 Fitzy - SF - 124.900 MHz; 385.450 MHz

The Fitzy sector is one of two Low sectors that overlies the Manchester Airport. This sector owns that airspace from the Manchester Airport to about 15 miles (24 km) south of Manchester from above the surface to and including 4,000 feet (1,200 m). The Fitzy sector is either a Final or an Initial Departure sector for the Manchester airport, depending on runway configuration. This sector also handles departures coming out of Nashua and arrivals going to Nashua.

 West - SW - 134.750 MHz; 254.250 MHz

The West sector overlies both Tommy and Fitzy sectors from above 4000 to and including 10,000. It also owns from above the surface to and including 10,000 in the vicinity of Laconia Municipal Airport (LCI). This sector is primarily responsible for descending arrivals into Manchester and handing off to either Tommy or Fitzy as appropriate. This sector also climbs westbound departures from either Tommy or Fitzy and hands off to Boston Center.

 Manchester Coordinator 

This coordinator is responsible for inter and intra-facility coordinator. This position has the capability to monitor any position / frequency.

Tommy - ST - 127.350 MHz; 385.450 MHz

The Tommy sector is one of two Low sectors that overlies the Manchester Airport. This sector owns that airspace from the Manchester Airport to about 25 miles (40 km) north of Manchester from above the surface to and including 4,000 feet (1,200 m). The Tommy sector is either a Final or an Initial Departure sector for the Manchester airport, depending on runway configuration. Tommy is usually combined at Fitzy.

Laconia - 119.850 MHz

This frequency is used to provide IFR clearances and cancellations to aircraft on the ground at Laconia Municipal Airport (LCI).

Concord - 133.650 MHz

This frequency is used to provide IFR clearances and cancellations to aircraft on the ground at Concord Municipal Airport (CON).

Nashua - 121.800 MHz

When Nashua Tower (ASH) is closed (between 9PM and 7AM), The Nashua Ground Control frequency is switched over the Manchester Area controller. Pilots can use this frequency for clearance delivery and IFR cancellations when on the ground at Nashua.

 Bedford - SB - 124.400 MHz

The Bedford sector is primarily a satellite sector for all airports north of Boston. The Bedford sector owns from the surface to between 2000 and 5,000 feet (1,500 m), depending on the distance from Boston Logan airport. Bedford primarily provides services to aircraft landing and departing Hanscom Field, Beverly Municipal, and Lawrence Municipal.

Bedford Coordinator (CB): This sector is responsible for assisting the Bedford Sector (SB) and any other sectors if necessary. The coordinator at this position manages inter-facility and intra-facility coordination.

 Rockport - SR - 118.250 MHz

The Rockport sector is primarily an arrival sector for Boston Logan arrivals over GDM and SCUPP, as well as a departure sector for all departures heading north. Boston Logan arrivals are handed off from Boston Center (GDM 36 sector123.750/338.200/PARSO 16 sector 128.200/263.050), descended and sequenced, and handed off to Final 1 or 2, depending on the assigned runway. The Rockport sector generally owns from above Final or Satellite airspace up to 14,000 feet (4,300 m).

Rockport Coordinator (CR): 

This coordinator is responsible for assisting the Rockport (SR) Sector. Like the other position this controller performs inter and intra-facility coordination.

Final 1 - F1 - 126.500 MHz

The primary Final sector for arrivals to Boston Logan. Most arrivals will talk to this controller before being transferred to Boston Tower. Final 1 generally owns airspace up to 6,000 feet (1,800 m) within about 8 miles (13 km) either side of the final approach course in use. Depending on the runways in use, this sector may or may not be combined with Final 2.

Final 2 - F2 - 119.650 MHz

The secondary Final sector for arrivals to Boston Logan. This sector is only functional in certain runway configurations. Final 2 is most often used for arrivals to 22L and 4L. Final 2 generally owns airspace up to 5,000 feet (1,500 m) within about 7 miles (11 km) either side of the final approach course in use. At most other times, Final 2 is combined at Final 1.

Boston Flight Data (FD-B)

One of the responsibilities of this position is that the controller makes flight plan entries and amendments via the FDIO and the STARS equipment. The controller reviews and flight plans for accuracy and forwards the strips to the appropriate sectors. They also issue departure clearances to aircraft. Another duty of this controller is to forward PIREP (Pilot Reports) to the appropriate facilities such as the flight service station.

Shared Sectors Between Boston North and Boston South 

 ·Initial Departure - ID - 133.000 MHz

All departures from Boston Logan will initially talk to this sector. Initial Departure issues an initial climb and turn to a departure, then hands off to either the Rockport, Plymouth, or Lincoln sector for sequence to their first fix. The altitudes owned by Initial Departure vary based on configuration. During the Mid-shift all the sectors are combined at initial departure ID).

 Lincoln - SL - 127.200 MHz

The Lincoln sector is primarily a West Departure sector. All departures heading westbound are handed off from Initial Departure to this sector, where they are sequenced, climbed to 14,000 feet (4,300 m), and handed off to Boston Center (BOSOX 47 sector 133.420/307.900). Lincoln also handles prop arrivals to Boston Logan over WOONS, descends them, and hands off to Final 1 or 2. Lincoln is always combined at Initial Departure, and is only opened for training purposes.

Boston - South Area 

 Lynch Coordinator (CL)

This coordinator position is responsible for assisting SM, Lynch Sector (AL) and other sectors if necessary. The coordinator also performs inter-facility and intra-facility coordination.

 Lynch - AL - 124.100 MHz

The Lynch sector is primarily a satellite sector for all airports south of Boston. The Lynch sector owns from the surface to between 2000 and 4,000 feet (1,200 m), depending on the distance from Boston Logan airport. Lynch primarily provides services to aircraft landing and departing Norwood Memorial. Depending on traffic Lynch Sector (AL) is usually combined with the Plymouth Sector (SM).

 Plymouth - SM - 120.600 MHz

The Plymouth sector is primarily an arrival sector for Boston Logan arrivals over PVD, as well as a departure sector for all departures heading south. Boston Logan arrivals are handed off from Boston Center (PVD 34 sector 124.85/269.200), descended and sequenced, and handed off to Final 1 or 2, depending on the assigned runway. The Plymouth sector generally owns from above Final or Satellite airspace up to 14,000 feet (4,300 m).

 
 OTIS ARRIVAL (O scope): 126.3000

This sector is responsible for traffic over the Cape Cod peninsula and Plymouth areas at and below 3,000 feet. Arrivals and departures from FMH, HYA, PYM, CQX, PVC, 5B6, and 1B2 airports.

 CAPE NORTH ARRIVAL (N scope):  118.2000

This sector is responsible for traffic over the Cape Cod peninsula and Plymouth areas at above 4,000 feet. It has sequence setting authority for ACK arrivals via the Marconi VOR (LFV).

 CAPE SOUTH ARRIVAL (S scope): 133.7500

Responsible for the separation of traffic in the vicinity of Martha's Vineyard island 050-100. This sector sequences IFR traffic into Nantucket Airport from the west and has sequence setting authority for Cape and Island departures westbound via Providence VOR.

 MARTHA'S VINEYARD ARRIVAL (Y scope): 119.7000

Responsible for Martha's Vineyard Airport arrivals and departures. This controller sequences and vectors IFR arrivals to the active runway and will radar identify, climb, and turn on course IFR departures from MVY. This sector also handles any IFR traffic into or out of the Katama Airpark.

 NANTUCKET ARRIVAL (D scope):  124.0500

Just as the name suggests, this sector sequences arriving IFR aircraft to the active runway at Nantucket Airport (ACK).

 NANTUCKET DEPARTURE (K scope):  126.1000

This sector is responsible for separating departing IFR traffic from ACK. This sector will also sequence IFR arrivals coming in from the opposite side of the airport from the final approach in use (example: traffic from the west when runway 24 in use) and hand them off to the Nantucket Arrival controller.

The Operations Room

General 
Located on the second floor of the facility. Below the operations control room on the first floor is the electronics room where all of the computer and other electronic equipment is housed, with extra space for expansion or testing of new equipment. The Facility is backed up by two 1250 kW diesel generators and 4 UPS units (two 225kVA, two 40kVA).

Wall displays 
A90 is equipped with multiple plasma flat-screen television screens which are used to display up to 16 different types of information needed by supervisory, traffic management and controllers-in-charge ranging from ETMS to Weather. Although they can be set to display almost anything, they will usually be set to one of three things. Commonly, a map of the Northeast United States will be displayed that shows all traffic landing or departing at Boston or Boston Satellite fields. This allows the controllers to look up at the screen and quickly tell if there is a rush about to come. Also commonly displayed is the IDS5 display. This information is also shown on a small touch-screen above each controller's station. Also, commonly displayed above the Initial Departure sector is a live video feed from Boston Tower showing the departure strip bay. This camera system is used to satisfy the requirement for "non-verbal rolling notification"  as required by FAAO 7110.65. What is displayed on each screen can be changed at one of the center console positions, which is controlled with a computer touch screen.

Training
A90 has a state-of-the-art simulator training facility located on the second floor just down from the operations control room. The room contains five training positions. The training room includes a Raytheon Standard Terminal Automation Replacement System (STARS). The STARS system has an embedded simulator ATCoach which is produced by UFA. Inc. out of Woburn, Massachusetts. This system provides the instructor and the student with a virtual display of live traffic on the STARS Terminal Controller workstation TCW. Raytheon provides the hardware and UFA provides the software and embedded simulator. Features of this simulator include:
- Weather
- Pre-programmed events
- 600 aircraft profiles
- Up to 24 simultaneous training exercises
- Scenario development tools
- Pseudo Pilot functions.
This is one of the most advanced simulators in the National Airspace System.

Accompanying ATCoach is ATVoice which provides the Voice Recognition and Response for the simulator. ATVoice allows the students to issue clearances directly to the simulated pilots during the exercise and then in turn ATVoice generates the proper pilot feedback/responses.

Above each TDW is an exact replica of the IDS-5 information display.

The facility also has State-of-the-art classrooms which are able to feature computer generated graphics and multimedia source material that comes right from the Operations room.

References

External links
UFA, Inc. official website
Systems Atlanta Official website.
Raytheon Official Website.
Northrop Grumman Official Website.
Federal Aviation Administration Official Website.

Air traffic control in the United States
Transportation in New England
Aviation in Massachusetts